Statland is a village in the northern part of the municipality of Namsos in Trøndelag county, Norway. The village has a school and Statland Church. The island of Otterøya lies across the fjord from Statland.

References

Villages in Trøndelag
Namsos